Transmogrify, a portmanteau of transfigure and modify, may refer to:

 Transmogrification, the act or process of being transformed into a different form
 Transmogrifier, a device in the Calvin and Hobbes universe that transforms its user into any desired creature or item
 Transmogrification Potion, a potion in the Neopets universe that changes the species of a pet